Elfgard Sibylle Schittenhelm (née Weismann; born 13 September 1947 in Leverkusen) is a retired German sprinter.

Schittenhelm competed for SpVgg Holzgerlingen and later for OSC Berlin.

Achievements

1947 births
Living people
West German female sprinters
Athletes (track and field) at the 1972 Summer Olympics
Olympic athletes of West Germany
Sportspeople from Stuttgart
European Athletics Championships medalists
Universiade medalists in athletics (track and field)
Universiade silver medalists for West Germany
Medalists at the 1973 Summer Universiade